is a 2010-2011 Japanese tokusatsu drama in Toei Company's Kamen Rider Series, being the twelfth series in the Heisei period run and the twenty-first overall. It began airing on September 5, 2010, the week following the conclusion of Kamen Rider W, joining Tensou Sentai Goseiger and then Kaizoku Sentai Gokaiger in the Super Hero Time lineup, until its conclusion on August 28, 2011. The series' titular Kamen Rider made a cameo appearance in the film Kamen Rider W Forever: A to Z/The Gaia Memories of Fate and a supporting character in other Kamen Rider movies.

Production

The Kamen Rider OOO trademark was registered by Toei on April 8, 2010.

OOO is written by Yasuko Kobayashi, known for the screenplays of Seijuu Sentai Gingaman, Mirai Sentai Timeranger, Kamen Rider Ryuki, Den-O, and Samurai Sentai Shinkenger. The creature designers are Yutaka Izubuchi, known for his work on the Lords in Kamen Rider Agito, and Tamotsu Shinohara, known for his work on the Mirror Monsters of Ryuki, the Orphnoch of Kamen Rider 555, and the Fangires of Kamen Rider Kiva.

Unlike several previous Heisei Rider Series, no alternate name has been given yet for the three O's in the title ( read as "Double" and  read as "Φ's/Phi's/Faiz") aside from an alternate spelling of the name of the main Kamen Rider: Ooz. The title OOO signifies the three medals that the main Kamen Rider uses to transform as well as being representative of the infinity symbol with an additional circle.

The 28th episode of Kamen Rider OOO serves as the 1000th episode of the Kamen Rider Series since Kamen Rider premiered on April 3, 1971. The episode was originally set to premiere on March 27, 2011. However, due to the 2011 Tōhoku earthquake and tsunami, the airing of this episode was postponed by one week to April 3, 2011.

Story

Eiji Hino is a traveling man who has no place to call home and a tragic past. When metallic creatures known as the Greeed awaken after their 800-year slumber to attack humans and feed off of their desires, the disembodied arm of the Greeed named Ankh gives Eiji a belt and three Medals to fight the other Greeed as Kamen Rider OOO. The mysterious Kougami Foundation approaches Eiji and begins assisting him in his fight against the Greeed, though their true motives are not clear. As Eiji fights the Greeed and their Yummy monsters, learning more about the Greeed and Ankh, he starts to find a purpose beyond his journey.

Episodes

Each episode title of Kamen Rider OOO consists of three objects featured in the episode.

Films
The character of Eiji Hino (portrayed by Watanabe) and Kamen Rider OOO made their debut in Kamen Rider Ws second film Kamen Rider W Forever: A to Z/The Gaia Memories of Fate.

Movie War Core

After the end credits of W Forever, a short teaser featuring Kamen Rider Double and Kamen Rider OOO stated that there would be a crossover film featuring both series' characters, much like Kamen Rider × Kamen Rider W & Decade: Movie War 2010. It is titled . As part of it, OOOs film  opened in Japanese theaters on December 18, 2010. The event of the movie took place between episode 12 and 13.

Let's Go Kamen Riders

, released on April 1, 2011, commemorates the 40th anniversary of the Kamen Rider Series featuring the cast and characters of Kamen Rider Den-O, Kamen Rider OOO, and other characters from the past franchise series. The event of the movie took place between episode 26 and 27.

The Shogun and the 21 Core Medals

 is the main theatrical release for Kamen Rider OOO, released on August 6, 2011, alongside the film for Kaizoku Sentai Gokaiger. It also features the first on-screen appearance of the 13th Heisei Kamen Rider: Kamen Rider Fourze. The event of the movie took place between episode 36 and 37.

Movie War Mega Max

A crossover film between Kamen Rider OOO and Kamen Rider Fourze in the same vein as the Movie War 2010 and Movie War Core films, titled , was released on December 10, 2011, in Japan.

Super Hero Taisen

 is a film which features a crossover between the characters of the Kamen Rider and Super Sentai Series. The protagonists of Kamen Rider Decade and Kaizoku Sentai Gokaiger were featured, but the casts of Kamen Rider Fourze, Kamen Rider OOO, and Tokumei Sentai Go-Busters also participated. Shu Watanabe and Riho Takada had reprised their roles as Eiji Hino and Hina Izumi, while Asaya Kimijima and Hiroaki Iwanaga reprised their roles voicing Kamen Rider Birth and Kamen Rider Birth Prototype respectively.

Movie War Ultimatum

 was released on December 8, 2012, as the annual winter "Movie War" film. Shu Watanabe made a cameo appearance, reprising his role as Eiji Hino as he only appears in the Movie War Ultimatum portion of the film.

Heisei Generations Final

A Movie War film, titled  was released on December 9, 2017. Along the casts of Kamen Rider Build and Kamen Rider Ex-Aid, Shu Watanabe and Ryōsuke Miura (Kamen Rider OOO), Sota Fukushi (Kamen Rider Fourze), Gaku Sano (Kamen Rider Gaim), and Shun Nishime (Kamen Rider Ghost) reprised their respective roles.

Video games
 A third port of Kamen Rider: Climax Heroes titled  was released on both the PlayStation Portable and Nintendo Wii on December 2, 2010. In addition to adding Kamen Rider OOO to the game, the previous Heisei Riders' most powerful forms (e.g., Kuuga Ultimate Form & Double CycloneJokerXtreme) have been added as playable characters as well as other Heisei Kamen Riders not included in either of the two previous versions.
 Kamen Rider: Memory of Heroez is a 3D action game, which was released on October 29, 2020 for PlayStation 4 and Nintendo Switch. It features the cast from Kamen Rider OOO, W, and Zero-One, whereas Kamen Riders OOO and Birth (both complete (Goto) and prototype (Date) versions) as playable characters. Instead of being reprised by Shu Watanabe, Asaya Kimijima and Hiroaki Iwanaga however, OOO and both Birth will be voiced by Tatsuhisa Suzuki, Soma Saito and Tomoaki Maeno respectively.

Hyper Battle DVD
 was released alongside an issue of Televi-Kun magazine. The DVD featured the Kangaroo Medal, which was used by Kamen Rider OOO to transform either his arms or legs to have kangaroo-themed powers.

"Kangaroo Dance" is a song used in the Hyper Battle DVD featuring Akira Kushida chanting "Kangaroo" in the background with composition & arrangement from Shuhei Naruse.

Final Episode
 is the director's cut version of the last two episodes of Kamen Rider OOO put together. It was released on DVD and Blu-ray on February 21, 2012.

V-Cinema
 is an upcoming V-Cinema release scheduled for a limited theatrical release on March 12, 2022, followed by its DVD and Blu-ray release on August 24, 2022. The events of the V-Cinema take place ten years after the TV series, with Eiji returning to help his friends alongside a revived Ankh in facing his predecessor, the First OOO, and the resurrected Greeed along with an artificial Greeed named Goda. As of the near-end of the movie, it also reveals to serve as a direct prequel to Movie War Megamax, to explain how Ankh time travels 40 years in the future. The V-Cinema is written by Nobuhiro Mouri and directed by Ryuta Tasaki, and its theme song is "Anything Goes! OOO 10th Mix" performed by Maki Ohguro.

Internet spin-offs
 is a web-exclusive series released on Toei Tokusatsu Fan Club on March 13, 2022 that serve as prequels to Kamen Rider OOO 10th: Core Medal of Resurrection.

 is a web-exclusive series released on Toei Tokusatsu Fan Club on July 3, 2022 that serves to connect Core Medal of Resurrection and Birth of Birth X: Prologue. The theme song is "Anything Goes! Happy 10th ver." performed by Eiji Hino × Ankh × Hina Izumi (Shu Watanabe, Ryōsuke Miura, & Riho Takada).

Novel
, written by Nobuhiro Mouri, is part of a series of spin-off novel adaptions of the Heisei Era Kamen Riders. The novel is split into three parts. The first part, Ankh's part, focuses on the origin of the Core Medals, the King, and the Greeeds from Ankh's point of view and reveals secrets unanswered from the series. The second part, Birth's part, takes on the Birth Driver's point of view, deciding between Akira Date and Shintaro Goto to see who is worthy to use it. The final part, Eiji's part, focuses on Eiji's past and reveals how he met Alfreed. The novel was released on November 30, 2012.

Cast
 : 
 , : 
 : 
 : 
 : 
 : 
 : 
 : 
 : 
 : 
 : 
 : 
 : 
 : 
 : 
 : 
 O-Scanner Voice, Medagabryu Voice: 
 Narration, Birth Driver Voice, Birth Buster Voice:

Guest cast

Hospital's director (13, 14): 
: 
: 
Female bikers (27): , 
Female fan (28): 
Shocker Combatmen (28): 

: 
: 
: 
: 
: 
:

Songs
Opening theme
 "Anything Goes!"
 Lyrics: Shoko Fujibayashi
 Composition: Tatsuo (of everset and Galveston 19)
 Arrangement: Tatsuo & Kōtarō Nakagawa
 Artist: 
"Anything Goes!" was released on November 17, 2010, as a standard CD and a CD+DVD combo pack. The rapping on the song was performed by Rah-D, who provided his vocal talent in some of the show's background music.
A balladic version of the song titled "Anything Goes! Ballad" was played during the finale of Kamen Rider OOO. Ohguro stated that she thought that the song would also work as a slow ballad, especially after she has been watching how the series has progressed, and recorded the song during her hiatus from releases. The balladic version was released as a single on December 7, 2011.
Insert themes Each of the series' various insert themes are titled in such a way to resemble the Kamen Rider OOO Combo that they serve as the theme for. The songs also feature Akira Kushida, the voice for the OOO Driver, chanting the name of the combo throughout the song. Ayano, a session guitarist for many of the recent Kamen Rider Series songs and member of the "Tsuyoshi & Ayano" group from the Kamen Rider W radio show, performs guitars on all of the tracks.
"Regret nothing ~Tighten Up~"
Lyrics: Shoko Fujibayashi
Composition & Arrangement: Shuhei Naruse
Artist: Eiji Hino (Shu Watanabe)
Episodes: 5, 7, 13
"Regret nothing ~Tighten Up~" was recorded throughout late September 2010 and recording completed on October 2, 2010. Shuhei Naruse was the song's producer and it was sung by Shu Watanabe under the name of his character Eiji Hino. It was first used in the October 3, 2010, episode. The pronunciation of "Tighten Up" is intended to mimic the pronunciation of "Tatoba". When played during scenes with other Combos, the "Tatoba" chant is removed from the song. The single for "Regret nothing ~Tighten Up~" features a ska arrangement by trombone player Eijiro Nakagawa.
"Got to keep it real"
Lyrics: Shoko Fujibayashi
Composition & Arrangement: Shuhei Naruse
Artist: Eiji Hino (Shu Watanabe)
Episodes: 6, 16, Movie War Core
The title of "Got to keep it real", Gatakiriba Combo's theme song, was revealed on Shu Watanabe's official blog on Gree.jp. The chorus features Sunaho of Labor Day. The single for "Got to keep it real" features a trance arrangement by Yoichi Sakai.
"Ride on Right time"
Lyrics: Shoko Fujibayashi
Composition & Arrangement: Shuhei Naruse
Artist: Eiji Hino (Shu Watanabe)
Episodes: 9, 10, 15, 40, 42, 45
"Ride on Right time" is Latorartar Combo's theme song. The additional rap vocals are by Tsuyoshi Himura, the Tsuyoshi of "Tsuyoshi & Ayano". The single for "Ride on Right time" features a "mixture" arrangement by Shamo and Florida Keys member Junichi "Igao" Igarashi.
"Sun goes up"
Lyrics: Shoko Fujibayashi
Composition & Arrangement: Shuhei Naruse
Artist: Eiji Hino (Shu Watanabe)
Episodes: 12
"Sun goes up" is Sagohzo Combo's theme song. The chorus featured Mr. Rah-D.
"Time judged all"
Lyrics: Shoko Fujibayashi
Composition & Arrangement: Shuhei Naruse
Artist: Eiji Hino × Ankh (Shu Watanabe & Ryōsuke Miura)
Episodes: 20, 22, 23, 25, 28, 48
The song has since been revealed to be titled "Time judged all", the theme for Tajadol Combo, and is a duet with Ryosuke Miura as Ankh. The song features Hyuga Rei and Mami Yanagi performing in the chorus, chanting in German. The "Full Combo Collection" album features a "dialogue" version as a bonus track.
"Shout out"
Lyrics: Shoko Fujibayashi
Composition & Arrangement: Shuhei Naruse
Artist: Eiji Hino (Shu Watanabe)
"Shout out" was first announced on April 17, 2011, by DJ HURRY KENN on the OOO Internet radio show, where he said the song for Shauta Combo would have a "Double-Action Rod form"-like feel, The song was played on the radio show, however it was never played in the series. Kaori Nagura of Kamen Rider Girls joins in the chorus.
"POWER to TEARER"
Lyrics: Shoko Fujibayashi
Composition & Arrangement: Shuhei Naruse
Artist: Eiji Hino (Shu Watanabe) & Akira Kushida
Episodes: 36, 44
"POWER to TEARER", the theme song for Putotyra Combo, is the first song that Akira Kushida was featured on the main vocals.
"Reverse/Re:birth"
Lyrics: Shoko Fujibayashi
Composition & Arrangement: tatsuo (everset)
Artist: Akira Date & Shintaro Goto (Hiroaki Iwanaga & Asaya Kimijima)
Episodes: 38, 46, 47
"Reverse/Re:birth" is Kamen Rider Birth's theme song. The music video for the song features Hiroaki Iwanaga as Akira Date, Asaya Kimijima as Shintaro Goto, and Mayuko Arisue as Erika Satonaka.

Other

Lyrics: Shotaro Ishinomori
Composition & Arrangement: Shunsuke Kikuchi
Artist: Kōichi Fuji
Episodes: 27
For the commemoration of the 1000th episode of the Kamen Rider Series, the original "Let's Go!! Rider Kick" was featured during the episode.
"WIND WAVE"
Lyrics: Tsuyoshi
Composition: Ayano
Artist: Tsuyoshi & Ayano
Episodes: 35
Tsuyoshi and Ayano of the Kamen Rider W Internet show Head Wind: One-Game Match!! have a cameo appearance as street musicians, in episode 35 where they perform their radio show's theme song "WIND WAVE".

The first soundtrack for Kamen Rider OOO was released on November 17, 2010; it includes an edit of the series' opening theme "Anything Goes!". The second soundtrack was released on June 22, 2011. The Kamen Rider OOO: Full Combo Collection album was released on July 27, 2011, debuting at number 8 on its day of release on Oricon's daily album ranking.

DJ HURRY KENN announced on Twitter that Kamen Rider OOOs "final song" would be recorded on July 18, 2011.

Notes

References

External links
 
 Official website at Toei Company
 Official website  at Avex Group
Kamen Rider OOO Song's Collection at Play Store

OOO
2010 Japanese television series debuts
2011 Japanese television series endings
Television shows written by Yasuko Kobayashi